Kuchanovo (Küsän) is a rural locality (a village) in Klyuchevsky Selsoviet, Askinsky District, Bashkortostan, Russia. The population was 127 as of 2010. There are 3 streets.

Geography 
Kuchanovo is located 22 km southwest of Askino (the district's administrative centre) by road. Klyuchi is the nearest rural locality.

References 

Rural localities in Askinsky District